Coleophora fuscolineata is a moth of the family Coleophoridae. It is found on Corsica.

References

fuscolineata
Moths described in 1898
Moths of Europe